A Midsummer Night's Dream is a two-act ballet choreographed by George Balanchine to Felix Mendelssohn's music to Shakespeare's play of the same name.

History
A Midsummer Night's Dream, Balanchine's first completely original full-length ballet, premiered at New York City Ballet on 17 January 1962, with Edward Villella in the role of Oberon, Melissa Hayden in the role of Titania, and Arthur Mitchell in the role of Puck. They were joined by Francisco Moncion in the role of Theseus- Duke of Athens.

Description
In addition to the incidental music, Balanchine incorporated other Mendelssohn works into the ballet, including the Overtures to Athalie, Son and Stranger, and The Fair Melusine, the "String Symphony No. 9 in C minor" and The First Walpurgis Night. 

The ballet employs a large children's corps de ballet.  Act I tells Shakespeare's familiar story of lovers and fairies while Act II presents a strictly classical dance wedding celebration.  The ballet dispenses with Shakespeare's play-within-a-play finale.  A Midsummer Night's Dream opened The New York City Ballet's first season at the New York State Theater in April, 1964.

Videography
A 1966 performance was filmed and released the following year. It featured Suzanne Farrell, Edward Villella, Arthur Mitchell and Gloria Govrin.

A performance in 1986 was filmed as a part of Live from Lincoln Center. The Lincoln Center released the video online in light of the impact of the 2019–20 coronavirus pandemic on the performing arts.

In 1999, a Pacific Northwest Ballet performance at the Sadler's Wells Theatre in London was filmed and released as a DVD.

The Paris Opera Ballet also released a recording of a performance during the 2019-20 coronavirus pandemic , which featured Eleonora Abbagnato, Laëtitia Pujol, Alice Renavand, Stéphane Bullion, Hugo Marchand and Karl Paquette.

When the coronavirus pandemic cut short the San Francisco Ballet 2020 performance to just its opening night on March 6, it was subsequently recorded in an empty War Memorial Opera House shortly after its opening and released as part of the all-digital 2021 season.

Casts

Other versions 

 Frederick Ashton (The Dream)
 Christopher Wheeldon
 Bruce Wells on the Boston Ballet
 Ib Andersen  on Ballet Arizona
 David Nixon on BalletMet Columbus
 John Neumeier on the Hamburg Ballet
 François Klaus  on the Queensland Ballet
 Heinz Spoerli  on Basel Ballet, Rhine Opera Ballet, and Zurich Ballet
 Lourdes Lopez on Miami City Ballet
 John Clifford on (The Portland Ballet)
Liam Scarlett on  The Royal New Zealand Ballet

References

External links 
A Midsummer Night's Dream on the website of the Balanchine Trust
Excerpts performed by San Francisco Ballet
Excerpts performed by Pacific Northwest Ballet
Tiler Peck on A Midsummer Night's Dream

Ballets by George Balanchine
Ballets to the music of Felix Mendelssohn
Ballets based on A Midsummer Night's Dream
New York City Ballet repertory
1964 ballet premieres